Perham Down is a village in Wiltshire, England, in Tidworth parish on the eastern edge of Salisbury Plain.

The main feature of the village is Perham Down Camp which was rebuilt between 1972 and 1974 and renamed Swinton Barracks at that time.

On Lamb Down to the south of the village is a linear earthwork, possibly a prehistoric boundary marker; it may have extended further north but that section would have been destroyed when the barracks were built.

For elections to Wiltshire Council, Perham Down falls within Ludgershall and Perham Down electoral division, electing one councillor. Boundary changes in 2020, effective from the 2021 election, place Perham within the Tidworth East & Ludgershall South division.

References

External links

Villages in Wiltshire
Swinton Barracks
Tidworth